Salem Heights is the name of several places in the U.S. state of Ohio, including:

Salem Heights, Columbiana County, Ohio
Salem Heights, Hamilton County, Ohio